The Wenchang Commercial Space Launch Site, located at Wenchang, Hainan, is China's first commercial space launch site, and 5th space launch site. The launch site started construction in July 2022, and is expected to be put into service in 2024.

See also
 Chinese space program
 Wenchang Space Launch Site
 Jiuquan Satellite Launch Center 
 Taiyuan Satellite Launch Center 
 Xichang Satellite Launch Center

References

External links

Buildings and structures in Hainan
Chinese space program facilities
Spaceports in China
Proposed transport infrastructure in China